The Constitution of 1833 was the constitution used in Chile from 1833 to 1925 when it was replaced by the Constitution of 1925. One of the most long-lived constitutions of Latin America, it was used to endorse both an authoritarian, presidential system and from 1891 onwards an oligarchic, parliamentary system. 

The constitution emerged after the Chilean Civil War of 1829 in which the conservative Pelucones (Whigs) defeated the Pipiolos (liberals). Its main ideologues where Mariano Egaña, Manuel José Gandarillas and Diego Portales all of whom saw from a conservative point of view the necessity of a unitarian state under a strong leadership. The constitution made Catholicism the state religion and forbade the practise of other religions, both in public and private life. The first president to be elected under the constitution was the general José Joaquín Prieto. The constitution allowed for 5 year terms with the possibility of one reelection which resulted in 3 consecutive conservative presidents ruling Chile each for 10 years. Mariano Egaña had initially aimed at not putting any restriction on reelection. 

Chilean liberals considered the constitution authoritarian and made attempts to overthrow the government.  During the failed Revolution of 1851 liberals in La Serena declared the constitution abolished. After the first liberal 10-year-long government the constitution was amended in 1871 to eliminate reelections.     

After the 1891 Chilean Civil War the constitution was amended in 1891, 1892 and 1893, and was interpreted
to endorse a parliamentary system. Chilean historiography refers to this period as the "pseudo-parliamentary epoch".

It was not until the turmoils of the 1920s that the constitution was replaced by the Constitution of 1925.

See also
 Chilean Constitution of 1925
 Chilean Constitution of 1980
 Liberal Party (Chile)
 Chilean Civil Code

References

Constitution
Defunct constitutions
Constitutions of Chile
1833 documents